Abdul Karim Haghshenas  (born 1919, Tehran – died on 24 July 2007, Tehran) was a contemporary Muslim jurist and mystic moralist.

In Tehran, he taught courses in ethics and religious affairs. Ayatollah Haghshenas died at the age of 88 on 24 July 2007, and he was buried in the Shah-Abdol-Azim shrine complex.

Professors 
 Mohammad Reza Tonekaboni
 Mirza Mahdi Ashtiani
 Seyed Muhammad Taghi Hojjat
 Muhammad Taghi Khansari
 Seyyed Hossein Borujerdi
 Syed Ali Haeri
 Seyyed Ruhollah Khomeini
 Mohammad Hussain Zahid
 Mohammad Ali Shahabadi
 Abu al-Qasim al-Khoei
 Muhammad Hujjat Kuh-Kamari
 Abdul Nabi Iraqi

See also 
 List of Ayatollahs

References 

People from Tehran
Iranian Shia clerics
Iranian Shia scholars of Islam
1919 births
2007 deaths
Iranian Muslim mystics